The Royal Albanian Army was the army of the Albanian Kingdom and King Zog I of the Albanians from 1928 until 1939. Its commander-in-chief was King Zog; its commander General Xhemal Aranitasi; its Chief of Staff was General Gustav von Myrdacz. The army was mainly financed by Italy from 1936 to 1939.

List of weapons

Artillery 
Type 41 75 mm Mountain Gun
Skoda 75 mm Model 1928
Cannone da 65/17 modello 13

Machine Guns 
Schwarzlose MG M.07/12
Vickers machine gun
Maxim gun

Guns 
Carcano M1891
Mannlicher–Schönauer
Mauser M1893
Mosin–Nagant

Pistols
Glisenti Model 1910

Manpower and Equipment

Army
780 officers  + 13,200 soldiers + 1620 NCOs
Around 43,960 conscripts (1939)
9 military districts
12 infantry battalions
2 motorized infantry squadrons
9 engineering companies
1200 tribal officers + 29,860 tribal militia
204 HMG
10,700 carbines (Carcano M1891, Mannlicher, Mosin)
1,104 revolvers (Glisenti M1889)
16,196 rifles (Beretta Model 38 &1918)
12 batteries of 65 mm Italian
6 batteries of 75 mm Skoda
2 batteries of 105 mm Italian
2 batteries of 149 mm Italian (8 guns)
1 coastal artillery battery in Durres
3 AA artillery batteries
2Fiat 3000B tanks
6 Ansaldo CV.33 tankettes
8 armored cars: 2 Bianchi, 6Lancia IZM

Navy
158 personnel
2 gunboats (ex-German minesweepers type FM=Flachgehende Minensuchboote)
170 t, 43/6/1.7 m, 14 kn., 76 mm gun, 2 MG
Built in 1918/19, bought c. 1925.
Shqipnja (ex-FM 16) & Skanderbeg (ex-FM 23)
4 Italian MAS boats
Built & bought in 1928 in Venice
46 t, 17 kn., 76 mm gun, 2 MG
Tirana, Saranda, Durres, Shengjin
1 Royal Yacht "Ilirja".

Air Corps
5 Albatros L.47s (de-militarised C.XV) 2 airworthy in April 1939

Gendarmerie
1,31 (officers) + 440 (NCO) + 3,206 (soldiers)
6 battalions (every battalion had 500 - 600 men)
Behind vehicles are the numbers that were in use by the Albanian army

See also
Military ranks of the Albanian Kingdom
Albanian Armed Forces
Zogu
Zogist salute
Royal Border Guard

References

Bibliography
Piero Crociani, "Gli Albanesi Nelle Forze Armate Italiane (1939-1945)", Roma 2001
Bernd Fischer, "Albania at War, 1939-1945", London, 1999
 Patrice Najbor, Histoire de l'Albanie et de sa maison royale (5 volumes), JePublie, Paris, 2008,.
 Patrice Najbor, La dynastye des Zogu, Textes & Prétextes, Paris, 2002
Time Magazine, April 17, 1939 (article "A Birth and a Death")  & Albania: Zog, Not Scanderbeg (Monday, Jun. 17, 1929)
"Jane's Fighting Ships", London, various years
"League of Nations Armaments Yearbook", Geneva, various years 1924-1938
e-archives of  Korrieri, Tiranë Gazeta and other Albanian  newspapers
on-line articles of the Albanian Headquarters and General Staff website
on-line articles of Ushtria Gazeta (Army Gazette)

External links 
Maison royale d'Albanie, site officiel en langue française
Famille royale d'Albanie, site officiel en langue anglaise